The March 8th Red Banner Pacesetter award is an honor given by the All-China Women's Federation on March 8, International Women's Day, to recognize outstanding women in China.

References 

People's Republic of China awards
All-China Women's Federation